Following is a List of senators of Pyrénées-Orientales, people who have represented the department of Pyrénées-Orientales in the Senate of France.

Third Republic 

Emmanuel Arago (1876–1896)
Pierre Lefranc (1876–1877)
Paul Massot (1877–1881)
Achille Farines (1882)
Lazare Escarguel (1882–1891)
Édouard Vilar (1891–1927)
Élie Delcros, de 1897–1904)
Jules Pams (1904–1930)
Victor Dalbiez (1927–1936)
Pierre Rameil (1930–1936)
Jean Payra (1936–1937)
Georges Pézières (1936–1940)
Joseph Parayre (1937–1940)

Fourth Republic 

Gaston Cardonne (1946–1948)
Joseph Gaspard (1948–1959)
Léon-Jean Grégory (1948–1959)

Fifth Republic 

Léon-Jean Grégory (1959–1982)
Gaston Pams (1959–1981)
Jacqueline Alduy (1982–1983)
Sylvain Maillols (1981–1983)
Paul Alduy (1983–1992)
Guy Malé (1983–1987)
André Daugnac (1987–1992)
Paul Blanc (1992–2011)
René Marquès (1992–2001)
Jean-Paul Alduy (2001–2011)
Christian Bourquin (2011–2014) (died)
Hermeline Malherbe-Laurent (PS) (2014–2017) after the death of Christian Bourquin
François Calvet (LR), from 2011
Jean Sol (LR), from 2017

References

 
Pyrenees-Orientales